Her Man may refer to:
 "Her Man" (song), a 1990 song written by Kent Robbins
 Her Man (1924 film), a romantic western silent film
 Her Man (1930 film), an American pre-Code drama film